Dan Baum (February 18, 1956 – October 8, 2020) was an American journalist and author who wrote for The Wall Street Journal, The New Yorker, Rolling Stone, Wired, Playboy, and The New York Times Magazine, among other publications.

Biography
Baum was born in Orange, New Jersey (or South Orange, New Jersey) to Seymour and Audrey Bernice (Goldberger) Baum. Raised in South Orange, Baum graduated from Columbia High School in 1974. He graduated from New York University in 1978.

He married Margaret L. Knox in 1987.

Career

He wrote about his firing from The New Yorker in one of the first twitter threads in the early days of Twitter.

Baum wrote four works of non-fiction including Nine Lives: Death and Life in New Orleans (2009). Baum wrote about New Orleans after Hurricane Katrina struck in 2005 for The New Yorker.

Books
 
 Smoke and Mirrors: The War on Drugs and the Politics of Failure (1996), about federal drug policy
 Citizen Coors: An American Dynasty (2000), about the brewing family
 Nine Lives: Death and Life in New Orleans (2009)
 Gun Guys: A Road Trip (2013)

Death
Baum died from glioblastoma in Boulder, Colorado on October 8, 2020.

References

External links

1956 births
2020 deaths
20th-century American journalists
American male journalists
21st-century American non-fiction writers
Columbia High School (New Jersey) alumni
Deaths from brain cancer in the United States
New York University alumni
People from Orange, New Jersey
People from South Orange, New Jersey
Playboy people
The New Yorker people
The Wall Street Journal people
Writers from New Jersey